UET Masters Series is a harness racing series arranged by European Trotting Union. It was launched in 2012 as a successor of European Grand Circuit that was competed since 1956. 

The series consist of four Grand Slam races (Prix d'Amerique, Lotteria, Elitloppet and Oslo Grand Prix) and almost one hundred Group 1 or Group 2 races in eight different European countries. The ranking is similar to ATP World Tour on tennis. Five best horses of every race collect points. These points are calculated from the last 365 days and a new updated ranking list is released weekly. 

From 12 to 16 top ranked horses meet every September on a final race which is named UET Trotting Masters. The final is held each year on a different racecourse. The first UET Trotting Masters was raced at the Solvalla racetrack in Stockholm, Sweden.

Points

Finals 2012–2015

Sources 
UET Masters Series at UET homepage

References 

Harness racing in Europe